Eram-e Sabz Metro Station is a station in Tehran Metro Line 4 and Line 5. It is located north of Tehran-Karaj Freeway and Ekbatan. It is the western terminus of Line 4, next to Shahrak-e Ekbatan Metro Station and it is between Azadi Stadium Metro Station and Sadeghieh (Tehran) Metro Station on Line 5. The station was formerly called Ekbatan (Eram-e Sabz), however the Ekbatan part of the name was dropped in July 2015, in order to avoid confusion with the nearby Shahrak-e Ekbatan Metro Station, as part of the city council's consideration of polling of the public opinions.

Architecture

Inside

References

Tehran Metro stations